The spiny red gurnard (Chelidonichthys spinosus) is a species of marine ray-finned fish belonging to the family Triglidae, the gurnards and sea robins. This species grows to a length of  TL. This species is of commercial importance as a food fish.

Taxonomy 
The spiny red gurnard was first formally described as Trigla spinosus in 1844 by the British medical doctor and naturalist John McClelland with the type locality given a "China". Within the genus Chelidonichthys this species is classified in the nominate subgenus. The specific name spinosus means "spiny" and alludes to the spine on either side of the nape, the large spine on humeral bone above the pectoral fins, a small spine on the operculum, and the pair of spines on the lower corner of the preoperculum.

Description
The spiny red gurnard has a large triangular shaped head which bears a number of ridges and spines, although it does not have an occipital groove. The diameter of the eyes exceeds the distance between them. Both the soft-rayed dorsal fin and the anal fin contain between 15 and 17 soft rays and the base of both the dorsal fins have small, robustly spined plates, known as bucklers, which result in ossification of the pteridygiophores. There are small scales on the body but the breast lacks scales. The overall colour is olive or brownish, changing to red under stress. The lower part of the pectoral fins has a large number of bluish spots scattered over it. There is some times a black blotch on the inner pectoral fin.

Distribution and habitat

Fisheries
The spiny red gurnard is regarded as an excellent food fish and is fished for by trawling throughout its range.

Gallery

References

External links

spiny red gurnard
Marine fauna of East Asia
spiny red gurnard